Sam Albatros is a pseudonymous Greek-born author, queer artist and poetry translator. They wear masks and have never shown their face publicly.

Early life and education 
Albatros was born and raised in rural Greece. They hold an MPhil in Psychology from University of Cambridge and a PhD in Cognitive Neuroscience from University College London.

Career 
Their debut novel Faulty Boy and its stage adaptations, which focus on a gender nonconforming/queer child, have attracted mainstream Greek media attention. As an artist, they have presented video-art performances in Greece, Cyprus, UK, and Berlin.

In May 2021, they took part in the Exchange Program Thessaloniki – Leipzig 2021, a two-month residency programme in Leipzig.

They publish original and translated poems on YouTube and on their website https://queerpoets.com.

Bibliography

Fiction 

 Faulty Boy (novel, Hestia Publishers & Booksellers, 2021)

Translated Poetry 
English to Greek translations:

 Richard Siken, Crush (Polis editions, forthcoming)

Awards 

 Stavros Niarchos Foundation Artist Fellowship by ARTWORKS, 2021

References 

Greek poets
Year of birth missing (living people)
Living people